China National Highway 112 is a 1228 km ring road which runs outside Beijing (municipality).

Route and distance

References

See also 

 China National Highways

112
Road transport in Beijing
Transport in Hebei
Road transport in Tianjin